The following outline is provided as an overview of and topical guide to Comoros:

Comoros – sovereign island nation located in the Indian Ocean off the eastern coast of Africa on the northern end of the Mozambique Channel between northern Madagascar and northeastern Mozambique.  The nearest countries to the Comoros are Mozambique, Tanzania, Madagascar, and the Seychelles.  At 2,235 km2 (863 sq mi) the Comoros is the third smallest African nation by area; and with a population estimated at 798,000 it is the sixth smallest African nation by population (though it has one of the highest population densities in Africa), and is the southernmost member state of the Arab League. Its name derives from the Arabic word  ("moon"). The country is notable for its diverse culture and history, as a nation formed at the crossroads of many civilizations. It has three official languages—Comorian (Shikomor), Arabic, and French, and it is the only state to be a member of each of the African Union, Francophonie, Organisation of Islamic Cooperation, Arab League, and Indian Ocean Commission, among other international organizations. However it has had a troubled history since independence in 1975, marked by an inordinate number of coups d'état.

General reference

 Pronunciation: 
 Common English country name:  The Comoros
 Official English country name:  The Union of the Comoros
 Common endonym(s):  
 Official endonym(s):  
 Adjectival(s): Comorian
 Demonym(s):
 ISO country codes: KM, COM, 174
 ISO region codes: See ISO 3166-2:KM
 Internet country code top-level domain: .km

Geography of the Comoros 

Geography of the Comoros
 Comoros is: a country
 Location:
 Eastern Hemisphere and Southern Hemisphere
 Africa (off its east coast)
 East Africa
 Southern Africa
 Indian Ocean
 Time zone:  East Africa Time (UTC+03)
 Extreme points of the Comoros
 High:  Le Kartala 
 Low:  Indian Ocean 0 m
 Land boundaries:  none
 Coastline:  340 km
 Population of the Comoros: 682,000 (July 2007)  - 160th most populous country

 Area of the Comoros: 2,235 km2
 Atlas of the Comoros

Environment of the Comoros 

 Climate of the Comoros
 Wildlife of the Comoros
 Fauna of the Comoros
 Birds of the Comoros
 Mammals of the Comoros

Natural geographic features of the Comoros 

 Glaciers in the Comoros: none 
 Comoro Islands
 Islands of the Comoros
 Mountains of the Comoros
 Volcanoes in the Comoros
 Rivers of the Comoros
 World Heritage Sites in the Comoros: None

Regions of the Comoros 

Regions of the Comoros

Ecoregions of the Comoros 

List of ecoregions in the Comoros

Administrative divisions of the Comoros 
None

Municipalities of the Comoros 

 Capital of the Comoros: Moroni
 Cities of the Comoros

Demography of the Comoros 

Demographics of the Comoros

Government and politics of the Comoros 

Politics of the Comoros
 Form of government: federal presidential republic
 Capital of the Comoros: Moroni
 Elections in the Comoros
 Political parties in the Comoros

Branches of government

Government of the Comoros

Executive branch of the government of the Comoros 
 Head of state: President of the Comoros
 Head of government: Prime Minister of the Comoros

Legislative branch of the government of the Comoros 

 Assembly of the Union of the Comoros (unicameral)

Judicial branch of the government of the Comoros 

Court system of the Comoros

Foreign relations of the Comoros 

Foreign relations of the Comoros
 Diplomatic missions in the Comoros
 Diplomatic missions of the Comoros

International organization membership 
The Union of the Comoros is a member of:

African, Caribbean, and Pacific Group of States (ACP)
African Development Bank Group (AfDB)
African Union (AU)
Arab Monetary Fund (AMF)
Common Market for Eastern and Southern Africa (COMESA)
Conference des Ministres des Finances des Pays de la Zone Franc (FZ)
Food and Agriculture Organization (FAO)
Group of 77 (G77)
Indian Ocean Commission (InOC)
International Bank for Reconstruction and Development (IBRD)
International Civil Aviation Organization (ICAO)
International Criminal Court (ICCt)
International Criminal Police Organization (Interpol)
International Development Association (IDA)
International Federation of Red Cross and Red Crescent Societies (IFRCS)
International Finance Corporation (IFC)
International Fund for Agricultural Development (IFAD)
International Labour Organization (ILO)
International Maritime Organization (IMO)
International Mobile Satellite Organization (IMSO)
International Monetary Fund (IMF)
International Olympic Committee (IOC)

International Red Cross and Red Crescent Movement (ICRM)
International Telecommunication Union (ITU)
International Telecommunications Satellite Organization (ITSO)
International Trade Union Confederation (ITUC)
Inter-Parliamentary Union (IPU)
Islamic Development Bank (IDB)
League of Arab States (LAS)
Nonaligned Movement (NAM)
Organisation internationale de la Francophonie (OIF)
Organisation of Islamic Cooperation (OIC)
Organisation for the Prohibition of Chemical Weapons (OPCW)
United Nations (UN)
United Nations Conference on Trade and Development (UNCTAD)
United Nations Educational, Scientific, and Cultural Organization (UNESCO)
United Nations Industrial Development Organization (UNIDO)
Universal Postal Union (UPU)
World Customs Organization (WCO)
World Federation of Trade Unions (WFTU)
World Health Organization (WHO)
World Intellectual Property Organization (WIPO)
World Meteorological Organization (WMO)
World Trade Organization (WTO) (observer)

Law and order in the Comoros 

Law of the Comoros
 Human rights in the Comoros
 LGBT rights in the Comoros
 Freedom of religion in the Comoros

Military of the Comoros 

Military of the Comoros
 Command
 Commander-in-chief
 Forces
 Army of the Comoros
 Air Force of the Comoros

Local government in the Comoros 

Local government in the Comoros

History of the Comoros 

History of the Comoros
Current events of the Comoros

History by subject 
History of rail transport in the Comoros
Postage stamps and postal history of the Comoros

Culture of the Comoros 

Culture of the Comoros
 Languages of the Comoros
 Comorian language
 Mass media in the Comoros
 National symbols of the Comoros
 National seal of the Comoros
 Flag of the Comoros
 National anthem of the Comoros
 People of the Comoros
 Public holidays in the Comoros
 Religion in the Comoros
 Christianity in the Comoros
 Islam in the Comoros
 Judaism in the Comoros
 World Heritage Sites in the Comoros: None

Art in the Comoros 
 Music of the Comoros

Sports in the Comoros 

Sports in the Comoros
 Football in the Comoros
 Comoros at the Olympics

Economy and infrastructure of the Comoros 

Economy of the Comoros
 Economic rank, by nominal GDP (2007): 179th (one hundred and seventy ninth)
 Agriculture in the Comoros
 Communications in the Comoros
 Internet in the Comoros
 Companies of the Comoros
Currency of the Comoros: Franc
ISO 4217: KMF
 Health care in the Comoros
 Mining in the Comoros
 Tourism in the Comoros
 Visa policy of the Comoros
 Transport in the Comoros
 Airports in the Comoros
 Rail transport in the Comoros

Education in the Comoros 

Education in the Comoros

Health in the Comoros 

Health in the Comoros

See also 

Comoros

Index of Comoros-related articles
List of Comoros-related topics
List of international rankings
Member state of the United Nations
Outline of Africa
Outline of geography

References

External links

Official site of the President of the Comoros
Drs. Martin and Harriet Ottenheimer - Comoro Islands
BBC News - Country Profile: Comores
CIA World Factbook - Comoros
US State Department - Comoros includes Background Notes, Country Study and major reports
al-Bab - Comoros directory category
Columbia University Libraries - Angola directory category of the WWW-VL
Stanford University - Africa South of the Sahara: Comoros directory category
The Index on Africa - Comoros directory category

Comoros
Comoros